Toki Jurozayemon Mitsuchika (died 1582) was a retainer of the Akechi clan and relative of Akechi Mitsuhide. He was the lord of Fukuchiyama in Tanba Province as well as a general who fought against Toyotomi Hideyoshi at the Battle of Yamazaki in 1582. He was killed in the battle.

References 

People of Azuchi–Momoyama-period Japan
Samurai
Daimyo
1582 deaths
Year of birth unknown